Christopher Grantley Sommers (30 June 1977) is an Irish-born actor who moved to Australia.

Education 
He received a Bachelor of Fine Arts (Acting) from the Queensland University of Technology (2000-2002). He undertook Master Classes at the 16th Street Studio (Melbourne) in 2012 with Ellen Burstyn, 2014 with Carl Ford and with Larry Moss in 2014 and 2016. He also attended a Masterclass with Ivana Chubbuch in Los Angeles in 2016.

Acting career 
While undertaking his degree Sommers acted in several stage productions, starting in 2001 in Uncle Vanya. Following his graduation he acted with several major companies mainly in Queensland although he did travel interstate with touring productions.

His first role was in a short film, The Machine, in 2002 and he has since appeared in short film, television series and feature films.

He has worked with Russell Crowe in The Water Diviner (2014), with Ethan Hawke and Sarah Snook in Predestination (2014) and John Cusack in Drive Hard (2014). Sommers stars in a feature film a zombie western Bullets for the Dead (set for release 2016) the first film for a joint venture between a Brisbane-based Cathartic Pictures and UK sales agent Stealth Media Group. It is intended to film a number of low budget genre films to be sold internationally.

Sommers has played diverse characters including a scientist, a bush bashing yokel, a soldier and comedy and says that growing older and changing your appearance allows you to play different roles.
Sommers also plays a magical halfling professor in the series "The Bureau of Magical Things".

Teaching 
Sommers is a co-creator of the 21 Day Actors Challenge.  Together with Angela Olyslager and Tanya Schneider they have put together a program to assist actors. The program is online and it includes acting exercises that will help participant be better prepared for stage and film roles. They also run Weekend Workshops.

Reviews 
A review by ABC Radio of the 2010 production of Fat Pig at the Bille Brown Studio, Brisbane, described him as "the always interesting Christopher Sommers", adding "In fact all performances were of the very highest quality. Sommers was likewise wonderfully sensitive".

Of the production of Beautiful (2008), the review in Stagediary stated:

... Christopher Sommers, as the mysterious almost sinister left-behind school friend, is the best example of this, and his triumph in this performance is to make his character almost seem like a bad actor who hasn’t learned his lines, until we notice the utter control he has over his movement and his voice. Stage presence doesn’t have to shout “Look at me acting!” – in this case, it’s all done by understatement.

Nathanael Cooper, in the Courier Mail review of Orphans (2011), wrote of Sommers:

The play is not easy to watch. It is troubling and harrowing and one particular scene sees Christopher Sommers absolutely own the audience as he describes, in gruesome detail, some of the darkest sides of life.

Awards 
2006 Matilda Awards Emerging Artist

2010 Matilda Awards nominated Best Male Actor in a Leading Role

Filmography

Film

Television

Theatre 
Christopher Sommers as actor unless otherwise stated

References 

Australian male film actors
1977 births
Living people
People educated at Brisbane State High School
21st-century Australian male actors
Male actors from Brisbane